El Bodón is a village and large municipality in the province of Salamanca,  western Spain, part of the autonomous community of Castile-Leon.

Geography
The postal code is 37520. The tour of the area is described by the English travel writer Richard Ford.

History
During the Peninsular War, the village was the site of the Battle of El Bodón which was fought on 25 September 1811 between the French army and Anglo-Portuguese army under Thomas Picton.

References

Municipalities in the Province of Salamanca